Little Melton is a village on the outskirts of Norwich in the South Norfolk district of Norfolk, England.

The villages name means 'middle farm/settlement'.

Notes

References 

 

http://kepn.nottingham.ac.uk/map/place/Norfolk/Little%20Melton

External links

Villages in Norfolk
Civil parishes in Norfolk